Gravity is the Enemy is an album by Skeleton Key, released in 2012 by Arctic Rodeo Recordings. On March 7, 2012 the band released a promotional video for the new album.

Track listing
All tracks written by Skeleton Key.

 "Gravity is the Enemy" – 4:15
 "Museum Glass" – 4:12
 "Human Pin Cushion" – 3:35
 "Little Monster" – 4:00
 "Iron Fist Alchemist" – 4:17
 "I'll Walk You To The Door" – 1:56
 "The Mowing Devil" – 4:07
 "Everybody's Crutch" – 4:23
 "Fear of Stalling" – 3:20
 "The Denialist" – 3:45
 "Machine Screw" – 3:14
 "Every Hero" – 2:55
 "Spineless" – 3:20
 "Roses" – 6:29

References

External links
 Official website 
 Facebook Page
 Arctic Rodeo Recordings

Skeleton Key (band) albums
2012 albums